The 2020–21 Coupe de France preliminary rounds, Nouvelle-Aquitaine was the qualifying competition to decide which teams from the leagues of the Nouvelle-Aquitaine region of France took part in the main competition from the seventh round.

A total of eleven teams qualified from the Nouvelle-Aquitaine preliminary rounds. In 2019–20, Pau FC progressed furthest in the main competition, reaching the round of 16 before losing to Paris Saint-Germain 0–2.

Schedule
A total of 674 teams entered from the region. The draw required a preliminary round involving 132 clubs on 23 August 2020. The remaining 488 teams from the district divisions, Régional 2 and Régional 3 entered at the first round stage on 30 August 2020. The 35 Régional 1 teams entered at the second round stage on 6 September 2020.

The third round draw, which saw the entry of the Championnat National 3 teams, was made on 15 September 2020. The fourth round draw, which saw the entry of the Championnat National 2 teams, was made on 24 September 2020. The fifth round draw was made on 8 October 2020. The sixth round draw was made on 22 October 2020.

Preliminary round
These matches were played on 22 and 23 August 2020.

First round
These matches were played on 29 and 30 August 2020, with a number postponed until 2, 5 and 6 September 2020.

Second round
These matches were played on 5, 6, 12 and 13 September 2020, with a number postponed pending outcomes from the previous round.

Third round
These matches were played on 19 and 20 September 2020.

Fourth round
These matches were played on 3, 4 and 6 October, with a number postponed to 7, 10 and 11 October 2020.

Fifth round
These matches were played on 16, 17 and 18 October.

Sixth round
These matches were played on 30 and 31 January 2021.

References

Preliminary rounds